The ambassador of Haiti to the United States is the chief diplomatic representative of the government of the Republic of Haiti to the government of the United States. The ambassador's office is located at the Embassy of Haiti in Washington, D.C.

List of representatives

References 

 
United States
Haiti